Samuel Gbenga Ajayi (born 2 July 1987) is a Nigerian professional footballer who plays as a forward for Koh Kong in the Cambodian League 2.

Career
Ajayi was born in Lagos. He previously played for Cambodian team Phnom Penh Empire where he was noticed by the 'Bankers' playing in the Singapore Cup.

Honours
 2008 Hun Sen Cup
 2009 Super Cup
 2010 Queen's Cup
 2015 Mekong Club Championship: Runner up
 2016 Cambodian League
 2017 Cambodian League

References 

1987 births
Living people
Yoruba sportspeople
Association football forwards
Expatriate footballers in Thailand
Samuel Ajayi
Boeung Ket Rubber Field players
Niger Tornadoes F.C. players
Phnom Penh Crown FC players
Nigerian footballers
Expatriate footballers in Cambodia